Hermanniellidae is a family of oribatids in the order Oribatida. There are about 9 genera and at least 50 described species in Hermanniellidae.

Genera
 Akansilvanus Fujikawa, 1993
 Ampullobates Grandjean, 1962
 Baloghacarus Mahunka, 1983
 Dicastribates J. & P. Balogh, 1988
 Hermanniella Berlese, 1908
 Hermannobates Hammer, 1961
 Issaniella Grandjean, 1962
 Mahunkobates Calugar, 1989
 Sacculobates Grandjean, 1962

References

Further reading

 
 
 
 

Acariformes
Acari families